Fernando Llanos (Mexico City, 1974) is a Mexican artist, writer, curator, producer, musician, and teacher. He works experimental art mainly with drawing and video and in the recent years he is focused on cinematography.

He is considered an active contemporary Mexican artists and is a reference in Latin American video artistic making. His work has been presented in places such as Guggenheim Museum, the Festival du nouveau cinéma in Montreal, the World Wide Video Festival in Amsterdam, Transmediale in Berlin, among others.

Bio 
He was born in the Hospital de México in Colonia Escandón, but lived in Valle Dorado, State of Mexico until he was nine years old. Later she lived in Morelia until he was nineteen years old, and from there he traveled to study graphic arts for a year in Florence. He returned to live in Mexico City, from where she has been producing ever since. He completed a degree in Art, with a video specialization at Escuela Nacional de Pintura, Escultura y Grabado "La Esmeralda". From an early age, his artistic work has moved between video creation, mail art, video action, performance and drawing.

In 2000 he made the "Videomails" project, which consisted of sending weekly, every Tuesday, for a year, artistic videos by e-mail to whoever subscribed. Llanos reached 1,600 subscribers, and with these videos he created in collaboration with Arcángel Constantini the first website of a video artist in Latin America: www.fllanos.com

In 2001 he began to develop a mobile video intervention project in specific urban contexts, called Videoman. This project has traveled through Mexico, South America and Europe. Llanos moves his career between curatorial, artistic and teaching activities. He was the founder and director of the Animasivo contemporary animation forum for the Festival de México (2008-2011). He has curated and disseminated more than 15 video curatorships both in Mexico and abroad. He was the curator of the Felipe Ehrenberg retrospective, "Manchuria" which was presented in Mexico and some countries as United States and Brazil.

In 2008, he formed Ediciones Necias publishing house from where he gives an outlet to his concerns about paper where he published Rinostalgias, which was presented at the Museo de Arte Moderno on April 5, 2014. At the same time he has created the musical project Mi Reyna since 2008 with which he has released 2 albums: "La realeza se mama" and "Venga a nosotros Mi Reyna". Since 2010 he made his first documentary feature film "Matria", which was released in 2016.

Works

Films

Documentary 

 Matria (2016)

Short film 

 Pixel y dinamita (2020)

In DVD 

 Conciencia Concéntrica, 2005
 Animasivo 1, 2008
 Animasivo 2, 2009
 La Cooperativa de arte en video, 2009
 Animasivo 3, 2010

Short videos 

 RPM, 1998
 VIDEOMAILS, 2010
 Making of “Amores Perros”, 2000
 Yo oy (Joy) 1998
 Tradición, 1998
 KIF KIF, 1998
 c.a.r.a.c.a.s., 1998
 El apoYOcabeza, 2000
 Serie “Videoviajes” 2000
 Serie “Memory full / Memory fool”, 2003
 Barras libres, 2002
 Transmitiendo trazos, 2003
 CITtA, 2004
 amor es, 2004
 vi_video, 2005
 Preguntas sobre pixel, 2006
 La muerte de Videoman, 2010
 Mónica, 2012

Books 

 Cursiagridulce. Trilce. 2006. p. 320. . 
 Handmade - 2003
 Preguntas - 2009
 Manchuria (Diamantina) - 2008
 Satélite, el libro (UAM) - 2012
 Videoman (Ediciones Necias) - 2008
 Venga a nosotros Mi Reyna (Ediciones Periféricas y Ediciones Necias)- 2013
 Ministructivo (Ediciones Necias) - 2011
 Espejulacciones, en colaboración con Felipe Ehrenberg - 2011
 Calendario (Ediciones Necias) - 2012
 Apuntes (Ediciones Necias) - 2013
 Calendario 2013 (Lilit)
 Adentro (Ediciones Necias) - 2013
 Rinostalgias (Proyecto Literal y Ediciones Necias) - 2014

Prizes and awards 

 Member of Sistema Nacional de Creadores de Arte of the FONCA since 2010. 
 Jóvenes Creadores Scholarship from Fondo Nacional para la Cultura y las Artes de México
 Best Documentary Award by Morelia International Film Festival, 2014 to his documentary Matria
 Diosa de Plata for Best Documentary, PECIME, 2015 to his documentary Matria

References 

Artists from Mexico City
Writers from Mexico City
Mexican curators
Mexican film producers
Musicians from Mexico City
1974 births
Living people